Susan Jane Smith (born 24 November 1979) is a former English international footballer who last played for Doncaster Rovers Belles and England. She is an experienced left–sided winger or forward.

Club career
Smith played for Tranmere Rovers since she was a teenager, but after years of fielding several offers from top clubs around the country, she signed on for Leeds United (known as Leeds Carnegie from 2008 until 2010) in the summer of 2002.

Following the failure of Leeds' bid to join the FA WSL, Smith signed for Lincoln Ladies in August 2010. In December 2011 Smith joined Doncaster Rovers Belles, who had tried to sign her on two previous occasions. Belles manager John Buckley described the capture of Smith as "a tremendous coup for the club". Smith scored on her Belles debut in a 2–1 FA Women's Cup win at Barnet, but was later carried off with damaged cruciate and medial ligaments. When she was subsequently ruled out for at least nine months, Buckley rued "a disaster for Sue and a disaster for the club."

After some injuries she left Doncaster before the 2017 season. She never announced her retirement from football, but has not played since the end of the 2016 season.

International career
Smith made her England debut as a 17–year–old substitute in February 1997, scoring in a 6–4 friendly defeat to Germany at Deepdale in Preston. One of her brightest England moments was scoring a hat-trick of tremendous goals in a home friendly against Spain in March 2001.

She has twice won the Nationwide International Player of the Year award – in 1999 and 2001. In 1999 she was also voted Players' Player of the Year.

Before winning the 1999 awards, Smith represented her country when she was picked to play in a FIFA XI against the USA in a showpiece match in San Jose.

She made her domestic comeback at the start of the 2002–03 season after suffering a broken leg and torn ligament damage after a training ground accident in February, and after featuring in the series of friendlies in the build-up to Euro 2005, narrowly missed selection in the final 20.

Smith bounced back, scoring against Austria in the first World Cup qualifier of the campaign, and was twice runner-up in the FA Women's Cup with her club Leeds United.

In May 2009, Smith was one of the first 17 female players to be given central contracts by The Football Association. In June 2011 she was surprisingly left out of England's 2011 FIFA Women's World Cup squad.

International goals
Scores and results list England's goal tally first.

Honours
FA Women's Premier League Cup: 1
2009–10
 FA Women's Premier League Northern Division: 1
1995–96
FA Players' Player of the Year Award: 1
1998–99
FA International Player of the Year Award: 2
1998–99, 2000–01

Media career
In 2000, Smith and her Tranmere teammates featured in a television advert for Daz washing powder alongside Julian Clary. Smith was later a regular contributor to the Yorkshire Evening Post's women's football section, and also offered her views and commentary skills for BBC sport. Most recently Smith appeared alongside Manchester United's Wayne Rooney in his three-part Sky1 show 'Street Striker'.

In July 2009 Smith was awarded an honorary degree by Edge Hill University. In November 2010 she opened Chipping Sodbury Secondary School's sports centre.

She has also appeared as a co-presenter on EFL on Quest, an EFL highlights show on Quest.

She currently works as analyst and color commentator for many platforms, often seen in Sky Sports for Women's Super League games.

Personal life
Throughout her career Smith has been recognisable by her hairstyles. She is an Everton F.C. supporter.

References

External links
 
Sue Smith at The FA website

1979 births
Living people
English women's footballers
Alumni of Edge Hill University
England women's international footballers
Tranmere Rovers L.F.C. players
Doncaster Rovers Belles L.F.C. players
Leeds United Women F.C. players
FA Women's National League players
Notts County L.F.C. players
Women's Super League players
Women's association football wingers
Women's association football forwards
2007 FIFA Women's World Cup players